The Faisalabad Clock Tower formerly known as the Lyallpur Clock Tower is a clock tower in Faisalabad, Punjab, Pakistan, and is one of the oldest monuments still standing in its original state from the period of the British Raj. It was built in 1905 by the British, when they ruled much of the South Asia during the nineteenth century.

The decision to build the clock tower on this spot was taken by the then Jhang deputy commissioner Sir James Lyall. The foundation of the majestic Clock Tower was laid on 14 November 1905 by the British lieutenant governor of Punjab Sir Charles Riwaz and the biggest local landlord belonging to the Mian Family of Abdullahpur Mian Abdul Raheem, Faisalabad (then known as Lyallpur). A water well formerly existed at the exact location of the Clock Tower which was filled with earth. The red sandstone used in its construction was brought from Sangla Hill Tehsil, about 50 kilometres away.The fund was collected at a rate of Rs. 18 per square of land. The fund thus raised was handed over to the Municipal Committee which undertook to complete the project. It took two years to complete the construction at a cost of Rs. 40,000.

The locals refer to it as "Ghanta Ghar" which translates into Hour House in English. It is located in the older part of the city. The clock is placed at the center of the eight markets that, from a bird's-eye view, look like the Union Jack flag of the United Kingdom. This special layout still exists today and can be viewed using the latest software from Google Maps. The eight markets (bazaars) each has unique product types for sale. The bazaars are named for the directions these open towards i.e. Katchery bazaar, Chiniot bazaar, Aminpur bazaar, Bhawana Bazaar, Jhang Bazaar, Montgomery bazaar, Karkhana bazaar and Rail bazaar. All these eight bazaars are also connected with each other through another round-shaped bazaar, which is called 'Gole Bazaar'.

During festivals of Eid and Independence Day of Pakistan, the mayor (nazim) of Faisalabad delivers a speech at this site and hangs the flag at full mast.

Significance in the History of Faisalabad 

Clock Tower or Ghanta Ghar is the most recognized building of Faisalabad. It is not only the center of the city, it is also the center of all the activities that happen in the city. During election season, each political party tries to hold rallies at this spot. The same is done for all political demonstrations. The central rally of Eid Milad Nnabi religious festival and the biggest procession of Moharram (annual religious event) is also held at Ghanta Ghar each year.

The importance of this iconic tower is so much that one of the leading Pakistani judges of the 1960s, Muhammad Rustam Kayani famously drew a parallel between the presidential system of General Ayub Khan and this clock tower because like Ghanta Ghar which is visible throughout the city, the presidential system of General Ayub made him of equal prominence.

See also 
List of clock towers in Pakistan
 List of tallest buildings in Pakistan
 Faisalabad
 Lahore
 Punjab (Pakistan)

References

External links 

 Clock Tower City dot com
 https://web.archive.org/web/20070210001724/ Faisalabad Government website
 The Clock Tower of Faisalabad – The Express Tribune
 

Buildings and structures in Faisalabad
Towers in Pakistan
Clock towers in Pakistan
Squares in Pakistan
Tourist attractions in Faisalabad
Towers completed in 1905
1905 establishments in India